The Battle of the Carmens is an informal name given to a figure skating rivalry between East German Katarina Witt and American Debi Thomas during the 1988 Winter Olympics in Calgary. The competition is so named because both Witt and Thomas independently elected to skate to the music of Bizet's opera Carmen in their respective long programs. Both skaters had performed very well at the 1987 World Figure Skating Championships (Witt won, with Thomas placing a close second), so it was expected that the duel for Olympic gold in 1988 would constitute a showdown between these two women.

The Battle of the Carmens was one of two such "battles" at the 1988 Winter Olympics, the other being the "Battle of the Brians."  Heading into the long program, which was worth 50% of the total score, Thomas was in first place (she placed second in compulsory figures and second in the short program) and Witt was in second place (she placed third in compulsory figures and first in the short program). However, both Thomas and Witt had underwhelming free skates. Despite omitting one of the more challenging jumps in her already technically inferior program, Witt skated well enough for the gold, but Thomas made significant mistakes in three of her planned jumps and placed 3rd overall in the competition. Canadian Elizabeth Manley won the silver medal over Thomas. The only standing ovations given were to Elizabeth Manley and Japanese skater Midori Ito, both of whom skated clean long programs which were more technically difficult than either Witt's or Thomas's long programs.

See also
 Figure skating at the 1988 Winter Olympics

References

TSN, 1988 Olympic highlights
The Times, Witt takes gold, but Manley is the heroine

Carmen
Sports rivalries
1988 in figure skating
Figure skating at the 1988 Winter Olympics
Figure skating in East Germany
Figure skating in the United States